Lo-Fi India Abuse is an album by Muslimgauze.

Pressings
1999 August: CD on BSI Records (catalog number: BSI 1999-3).
2000 February 22: 12" vinyl on BSI Records (catalog number: BSI 1999-3). Limited to 100 copies.

Credits
Artwork By - Ezra Ereckson
Featuring [Source Tracks] - Systemwide
Mastered By - Sound Secretion
Photography - Tracy Harrison
Recorded By - Muslimgauze
Notes:	All tracks recorded 1998
Some tracks are re-mixs from Systemwide's "Sirius" (BSI 1997-2)

Track listing

CD
"Antalya" - 3:22
"Romanic Abuse" - 2:09
"Valencia In Flames" - 3:30
"Al Souk Dub" - 6:13
"Catacomb Dub" - 6:06
"Dust Of Saqqara" - 7:57
"Android Cleaver" - 4:25
"Dogon Tabla" - 3:30
"Nommos' Afterburn" - 6:21

12" vinyl
Side A
"Antalya"
"Romanic Abuse"
"Valencia In Flames"
"Al Souk Dub"
"Catacomb Dub"
Side B
"Dust Of Saqqara"
"Android Cleaver"
"Dogon Tabla"
"Nommos' Afterburn"

References
http://www.discogs.com/release/107104
http://www.discogs.com/release/197434

Muslimgauze albums